Lider may refer to:

 Lider (political party), a political party in Bulgaria
 Lider-class destroyer, a class of ships of the Russian Navy
 Líder, a retail chain in Chile
 Renewed Democratic Liberty, abbreviated LIDER, a political party in Guatemala